Tunisia Forward (French: Tunisie en avant; Arabic: تونس إلى الأمام ) is a political party in Tunisia.

History 
The party is left-wing and was founded 7 May 2018 by Abid Briki.

The party will participate in the 2022 parliamentary election despite reservations on certain articles of the electoral law which could have repercussions on the results, according to the movement. They also call for the formation of an electoral front bringing together all the progressive forces that support the July 25 process. Party secretary general Abid Briki would not stand as a candidate

References

See also 

 List of political parties in Tunisia

Political parties in Tunisia
Left-wing parties in Africa
2018 establishments in Tunisia
Political parties established in 2018